SAMCO Inc. is a Japanese electronics manufacturing company.
SAMCO or Samco may also refer to:

Samco Scientific, a manufacturer of laboratory equipment
Samco Global Arms, Inc., owners of Charles Daly firearms
SAM Computers Ltd., a company that formerly marketed the SAM Coupé home computer
Sai Gon Mechanical Engineering Corporation, a Vietnamese automobile manufacturer

See also
Simco (disambiguation)